MCHB-1 is a benzimidazole derived drug which was researched as an analgesic but never developed for medical use. It acts as a potent agonist of the CB2 receptor, with an EC50 of 0.52nM at CB2, and ~30x selectivity over CB1 (Ki of 110nM at CB1 vs 3.7nM at CB2). It has been sold online as a designer drug, first being identified in Germany in December 2013.

See also 
 AZD1940
 AZ-11713908
 BIM-018
 Etazen

References 

Benzimidazoles
Cannabinoids
Designer drugs